Lauri Juho Antti Heikkilä (born 24 June 1957 in Rymättylä) is a Finnish politician, representing the Finns Party. He was elected to the Parliament of Finland in April 2011. He is a lecturer of micro electronics at the University of Turku, but does also farming.

In the 2015 parliamentary election, Heikkilä got 3,658 votes and was not re-elected.

From 1996 to 2011 Heikkilä was much involved in the making of Finns Party platforms.

References

External links
 

1957 births
Living people
People from Naantali
Finnish Lutherans
Finns Party politicians
Members of the Parliament of Finland (2011–15)